VersaBank is a Canadian chartered bank that was founded as a trust company in Saskatoon, Saskatchewan in 1980. It later moved its head offices to London, Ontario, and on August 1, 2002, it was granted a Schedule I Canadian chartered bank licence by the Canadian federal government, the first in approximately 18 years. The bank is publicly traded as VBNK on both the Toronto Stock Exchange and on the Nasdaq.

History 
Beginning in 1993, the existing Pacific & Western Trust, a small trust company with six branches and a need for capital investment, was reconfigured into the world's first branchless, electronic bank.  By 2013, the bank became Canada's tenth largest publicly traded bank when it began trading on the Toronto Stock Exchange.  In 2017 the bank completed a revision of its ownership structure that included a merger with its largest stockholder, PWC Capital, reported to be "the first merger between a Schedule 1 bank and a holding company operating under the Canadian Business Corporations Act".

The bank's deposits are raised digitally by way of a comprehensive broker network situated throughout Canada. In 2016, there were over 120 deposit broker firms raising its deposits, including many of the in-house brokerage firms of the big six Canadian banks. Its lending portfolio consists of commercial and corporate lending, real estate and development financing, and an innovative, electronic receivable purchase program.

In May 2016, the bank changed its name to VersaBank because Versa is the prefix for versatile and because Pacific & Western had little direct relevance given the Bank’s national and virtual focus.

See also

Discovery Air
List of Canadian banks

References

External links
 Official site

Banks of Canada
Companies based in London, Ontario
1980 establishments in Saskatchewan
Companies listed on the Toronto Stock Exchange
Banks established in 1980
Online banks